Jacqueline Emma Clarke  (born 1966) is a New Zealand entertainer, singer and comedian. She was a judge on New Zealand Idol in 2005.

In 2016, she was named Top Female Artist by the Variety Artists Club of New Zealand.

In the 2018 Queen's Birthday Honours, Clarke was appointed a Member of the New Zealand Order of Merit, for services to the entertainment industry.

Credits (incomplete)

Television
 Judge for the second season of New Zealand Idol (2005)
 Judge for the second and third seasons of Showcase (1997–98)
 Saturday Live (TV2) co-host
 Skitz (TV3) (1993)
 The Dreamstone as Wildit, Zarag
 Molly's Gang (1995)
 The Semisis (TV3) (1998)
 The Jaquie Brown Diaries (2008)
 Power Rangers Dino Charge (2015) (voice)
 Power Rangers Dino Super Charge (2016) (voice)
 Power Rangers Super Ninja Steel (2018) (voice)
 Power Rangers Beast Morphers (2020) (voice)

Film
 GURL

Documentary
 Wise Women and Song (TV1)
 Twins (TV2)

Theatre
 A Christmas Carol (ATC)
 Mum's the Word (NZ tour)
 Joseph and the Amazing Technicolour Dreamcoat (New Zealand tour)
 Porgy and Bess (Mercury Theatre)
 Little Shop of Horrors (Sky City Theatre)
 The Underwatermelonman (New Zealand International Festival of the Arts)
 And the World Goes 'Round (Sky City Theatre)
 C – A Musical (Circa Theatre)

Singing
 Sirens (with Tina Cross)
 Auckland Philharmonia
 Christchurch Symphony
 Taranaki Arts Festival
 Broadway Songbirds (with Ellie Smith) at Downstage Theatre
 Christchurch Festival
 Love Hate Relationship (with Tim Beveridge and Penny Dodd) for the Tauranga Arts Festival
 When The Cat's Been Spayed
 Coca-Cola Xmas in the Park
 Schweppes Showtime
 NBR Stadium Spectacular
 Sky City Starlight Symphony and Lakeside
 NZSO (My Fair Lady, Around the World in 80 minutes)
 APO (Blockbusters 2001, Decades of Rock 2004, 2005)
 the CS (The Proms, Fresh Sounds 2000)
 Dunedin Sinphonia (ENZO 2000, Carnival of the Animals 2002)
 The Ladykillers

Personal life
Clarke's father was Samoan. She has a twin sister Robyn, who is a nurse.

References

External links
 Jackie Clarke's website

1966 births
Living people
New Zealand women comedians
20th-century New Zealand women singers
New Zealand stage actresses
New Zealand television actresses
New Zealand Idol
 New Zealand people of Samoan descent
Place of birth missing (living people)
Members of the New Zealand Order of Merit
People educated at Gisborne Girls' High School